Denmark competed at the 1956 Summer Olympics in Melbourne, Australia and Stockholm, Sweden (equestrian events). 31 competitors, 27 men and 4 women, took part in 25 events in 10 sports.

Medalists

Gold
 Paul Elvstrøm — Sailing, Men's Finn Individual Competition

Silver
 Lis Hartel — Equestrian, Dressage Individual
 Ole Berntsen, Christian von Bülow and Cyril Andresen — Sailing, Men's Dragon Team Competition

Bronze
 Tove Søby — Canoeing, Women's K1 500 metres Kayak Singles

Athletics

Boxing

Canoeing

Cycling

Time trial
Allan Juel Larsen — 1:14.3 (→ 13th place)

Individual road race
Palle Lykke Jensen — did not finish (→ no ranking)

Diving

Women's 10m Platform
Hanna Laursen
 Preliminary Round — 35.39 (→ did not advance, 17th place)

Fencing

One fencer represented Denmark in 1956.

Women's foil
 Karen Lachmann

Rowing

Denmark had seven male rowers participate in three out of seven rowing events in 1956.

 Men's coxless pair
 Finn Pedersen
 Kjeld Østrøm

 Men's coxless four
 Elo Tostenæs
 Mogens Sørensen
 Børge Hansen
 Tage Grøndahl

 Men's coxed four
 Elo Tostenæs
 Mogens Sørensen
 Børge Hansen
 Tage Grøndahl
 John Vilhelmsen (cox)

Sailing

Open

Shooting

Two shooters represented Denmark in 1956.

50 m rifle, three positions
 Uffe Schultz Larsen
 Ole Hviid Jensen

50 m rifle, prone
 Uffe Schultz Larsen
 Ole Hviid Jensen

Swimming

References

External links
Official Olympic Reports
International Olympic Committee results database

Nations at the 1956 Summer Olympics
1956
Summer Olympics